Jack Hamann (born November 9, 1954) is an American television correspondent, documentary producer, and author.

Work 
His 2005 book On American Soil investigated the August 1944 killing of Italian prisoner of war Guglielmo Olivotto at Fort Lawton in Seattle, Washington, and concludes that the resulting military trial—in which Leon Jaworski was the lead prosecutor—was a miscarriage of justice. Whereas Hamann's own 1987 documentary on the subject largely accepted the then-conventional view that Olivotto had been lynched by African-American soldiers, the book went back to primary sources and heavily revised this view. The book led to a congressional review and ultimately the voiding of the court-martial of those soldiers.

Hamann reported for KING-TV from 1983 to 1990. He also worked for CNN and PBS, and won ten regional Emmy Awards.

Bibliography

See also
 Fort Lawton Riot

Notes

External links

 
 No Little Things Productions
 KPLU interview with Hamann about On American Soil , 2005-04-27
 2007 Horace Mann Award Recipient - Jack Hamann, Antioch University Seattle
  Hamann discusses On American Soil at the Pritzker Military Museum & Library

1954 births
Living people
American male journalists
Writers from Seattle
Film producers from Washington (state)